Matson is an English-language surname of multiple possible origins. Notable people with the surname include:

 Aaron Matson (1770–1855), U.S. Representative from New Hampshire
 April Matson (born 1981), American actress
 Boyd Matson (born 1947),  American TV anchor
 Canute R. Matson (1843–1903),  Norwegian-born American politician
 Chelsey Matson (born 1982), Canadian curler
 Courtland C. Matson (1841–1915), U.S. Representative from Indiana
 Frank Matson (1905–1985), Welsh footballer
 Harold Matson (1898–1988), American literary agent
 Johnny Matson (born 1951), professor of psychology at Louisiana State University
 Leroy E. Matson (1896–1950), American jurist
 Lurline Matson Roth, American heiress, equestrian, philanthropist from San Francisco.
 Margaret Matson, alleged witch in 17th-century Pennsylvania
 Michael Matson (born 1984), American adventurer
 Ollie Matson (1930–2011), American football player and sprinter
 Pamela Matson (born 1953), dean of the School of Earth Sciences at Stanford University
 Pat Matson (born 1944), American Football League and National Football League offensive lineman
 Phil Matson (1884–1928), Australian rules football player and coach
 Randy Matson (born 1945), American shot putter and Olympic gold medalist
 Taylor Matson (born 1988), American professional ice hockey player
 Victor Matson (1895–1972), American painter
 William Matson (1849–1917), founder of the Matson Navigation Company

See also
Mattson

References

Patronymic surnames